Lincolnville is a small community in the Canadian province of Nova Scotia, located in the Municipality of the District of Guysborough in Guysborough County. Lincolnville is a predominantly African-Canadian community situated next to Upper Big Tracadie. The community is served by the Lincolnville Community Center and the Tracadie United Baptist Church. One of the last segregated schools in Nova Scotia, the Lincolnville School closed in 1983.

References
Lincolnville on Destination Nova Scotia

Lincolnville: Race and Waste
 Lincolnville Development
 Essay on Lincolnville's Black Community

Communities in Guysborough County, Nova Scotia
Black Canadian settlements
General Service Areas in Nova Scotia